Pride is an unincorporated community in East Baton Rouge Parish, Louisiana, United States. Its ZIP code is 70770.

History
A post office was established at Pride in 1886. The origin of Pride's name is unknown.

Government and infrastructure
The U.S. Postal Service operates the Pride Post Office.

Education
East Baton Rouge Parish Public Schools operates public schools:
 Northeast Elementary School
 Northeast Middle School and Northeast High School

Library

East Baton Rouge Parish Library operates the Pride-Chaneyville Branch Library. The library first opened in 1941. It was initially located in the gymnasium of Pride High School. The next location was a temporary building on the grounds of Northeast Elementary School,  large, where it moved in 1983. It moved into its current location, a  standalone building across from the elementary school and adjacent to Northeast High School, on December 12, 2005. This building was designed by Robert Coleman & Partners Architects, AIA. The branch will reopen in February 2017 due to replacement reasons.

Notable person
Actress Donna Douglas was born in Pride.

References

Unincorporated communities in East Baton Rouge Parish, Louisiana
Unincorporated communities in Louisiana